Joshua Izuchukwu Onyeachonam (born July 24, 1984 in Onitsha) is a Nigerian football player who last played in Cyprus  in February 2015. 
Currently he is the assistant coach at BK Olympic Lindängen in Malmo, Sweden.

Career
He signed for AEK Larnaca on Mid-season of 2008 until 2010 in Cyprus.

References

1984 births
Living people
Nigerian footballers
Nigerian expatriate footballers
AEK Larnaca FC players
Nea Salamis Famagusta FC players
APEP FC players
Nikos & Sokratis Erimis FC players
Ayia Napa FC players
Cypriot First Division players
Cypriot Second Division players
Expatriate footballers in Cyprus
Nigerian expatriate sportspeople in Cyprus
Expatriate footballers in Egypt
Expatriate footballers in Moldova
Nigerian expatriate sportspeople in Moldova
Sharks F.C. players
Nigerian expatriate sportspeople in Egypt
Al Ittihad Alexandria Club players
Al Mokawloon Al Arab SC players
Association football midfielders
Sportspeople from Onitsha